Aptera is a genus of cockroaches belonging to the family Blaberidae.

The species of this genus are found in South African Republic.

Species:

 Aptera brindlei 
 Aptera fusca 
 Aptera munda

References 

Blaberidae
Cockroach genera